Andy J. Welti (born May 28, 1980) was a member of the Minnesota House of Representatives. A Democrat, he was first elected in 2004, defeating four-term incumbent Republican Bill Kuisle. Just 24 years of age at the time, his victory over Kuisle (who served as chair of the Transportation Committee, and was also a member of the Ways and Means Committee) was regarded as a significant political upset in the traditionally Republican area.

Welti represented District 30B, which includes portions of Rochester and largely rural areas of Olmsted, Winona, and Wabasha counties, including the towns of Stewartville, Dover, Eyota, Chatfield, part of St. Charles, and his home town of Plainview. His parents continue to own and operate a farm located just outside Plainview.

Welti won re-election in 2006 with 52% of the vote and again in 2008 with 56% of the vote.  Both contests were re-matches against Kuisle. In the aftermath of the 2008 election, he was elected by his DFL colleagues as one of eight assistant majority leaders. He was unseated by Republican Mike Benson in the 2010 general election. During his time in the legislature, his work has focused largely on veteran's affairs, education, agriculture and alternative energy.

Committee assignments
Committees served on during the 2009-10 biennium:
 Agriculture, Rural Economies and Veterans Affairs Finance Division
 Energy Finance and Policy Division Committee
 Higher Education and Workforce Development Finance and Policy Division
 Transportation and Transit Policy and Oversight Division
 Transportation Finance and Policy Division

Committees served on during the 2007-08 biennium:
 Energy Finance and Policy Division
 Higher Education and Work Force Development Policy and Finance Division
 E-12 Education
 Agriculture, Rural Economics, and Veterans Affairs Division.

Committees served on during the 2005-06 biennium:
 Agriculture and Rural Development
 Environment and Natural Resources
 Governmental Operations and Veterans Affairs

References

External links

 MN House Biography

1980 births
Living people
People from Plainview, Minnesota
Minnesota State University, Mankato alumni
Democratic Party members of the Minnesota House of Representatives
21st-century American politicians